Richard Tambling (born 12 September 1986) is a former Australian rules footballer who played for the Richmond Football Club and the Adelaide Football Club in the Australian Football League (AFL).

AFL career

Richmond (2005-2010)
In the 2004 AFL Draft Tambling was a first round selection, the number four pick overall, and drafted to the Richmond Football Club. Richmond had the opportunity to recruit Lance Franklin, some say this was bad judgement made by the Richmond recruitment personnel. In comparison to Franklin, Tambling's tenure at Richmond has been enigmatic. He had long been considered a dominant player up in the Northern Territory with his explosive speed and ability to read the play; he only confirmed that status throughout the 2004 pre-season. Terry Wallace was particularly impressed, saying he and Deledio were the "best young kids in the country".

He played in 12 games in the 2005 AFL season and a further 21 in the 2006 AFL season. In the latter stages of 2005, Tambling struggled with injury, including a broken toe and a consistent hamstring problem.

By 2009 the constant criticism of the underperforming midfielder reached new heights in the round 3 match between the Western Bulldogs and the Richmond Tigers. Tambling's game was viewed by many experts as one of the worst performances of faltering career due to the amount of costly turnovers from his small total of 12 possessions. He received a bronx cheer from the Richmond fans after getting his first kick which also happened to be a turnover.  Coach Terry Wallace later explained that Tambling had become a father in the two days earlier, which had affected his sleep before the match. Tambling was dropped from the Richmond team for the following match against the Demons. After a week at Coburg, he returned to the AFL in arguably the best form of his career. Very influential against Sydney, Fremantle, and the West Coast Eagles, he was finally showing the ability that was expected of him with his high draft pick.

Adelaide (2011-2013)
On 6 October 2010 Tambling was traded to the Adelaide Crows in exchange for a first and a third round draft selection.
He was delisted at the end of the 2013 season, following 16 AFL matches over three years at the club.

State league football
After playing for Sturt in the SANFL, he has since played for the NT Thunder in the 2015, 2016 and 2017 NEAFL competitions.

Statistics

|- style="background-color: #EAEAEA"
! scope="row" style="text-align:center" | 2005
|  || 30 || 12 || 9 || 4 || 73 || 38 || 111 || 41 || 28 || 0.8 || 0.3 || 6.1 || 3.2 || 9.2 || 3.4 || 2.1
|-
! scope="row" style="text-align:center" | 2006
|  || 30 || 21 || 14 || 19 || 176 || 76 || 252 || 92 || 48 || 0.7 || 0.9 || 8.4 || 3.6 || 12.0 || 4.4 || 2.3
|- style="background-color: #EAEAEA"
! scope="row" style="text-align:center" | 2007
|  || 30 || 20 || 17 || 9 || 160 || 112 || 272 || 93 || 49 || 0.8 || 0.4 || 8.0 || 5.6 || 13.6 || 4.6 || 2.4
|-
! scope="row" style="text-align:center" | 2008
|  || 30 || 22 || 10 || 9 || 202 || 182 || 384 || 113 || 72 || 0.4 || 0.4 || 9.2 || 8.3 || 17.4 || 5.1 || 3.3
|- style="background-color: #EAEAEA" 
! scope="row" style="text-align:center" | 2009
|  || 30 || 20 || 8 || 11 || 241 || 189 || 430 || 128 || 63 || 0.4 || 0.6 || 12.0 || 9.4 || 21.5 || 6.4 || 3.2
|-
! scope="row" style="text-align:center" | 2010
|  || 30 || 13 || 3 || 3 || 79 || 84 || 163 || 38 || 57 || 0.2 || 0.2 || 6.1 || 6.5 || 12.5 || 2.9 || 4.4
|- style="background-color: #EAEAEA" 
! scope="row" style="text-align:center" | 2011
|  || 1 || 10 || 0 || 0 || 68 || 77 || 145 || 36 || 28 || 0.0 || 0.0 || 6.8 || 7.7 || 14.5 || 3.6 || 2.8
|-
! scope="row" style="text-align:center" | 2012
|  || 1 || 1 || 0 || 0 || 4 || 2 || 6 || 2 || 2 || 0.0 || 0.0 || 4.0 || 2.0 || 6.0 || 2.0 || 2.0
|- style="background-color: #EAEAEA" 
! scope="row" style="text-align:center" | 2013
|  || 1 || 5 || 1 || 0 || 36 || 44 || 80 || 23 || 15 || 0.2 || 0.0 || 7.2 || 8.8 || 16.0 || 4.6 || 3.0
|- class="sortbottom"
! colspan=3| Career
! 124
! 62
! 55
! 1039
! 804
! 1843
! 566
! 359
! 0.5
! 0.4
! 8.4
! 6.5
! 14.9
! 4.6
! 2.9
|}

Personal life
Richard is an Indigenous Australian and his ancestry can be traced to the Woolna, a Northern Territory tribe.

Notes

External links

1986 births
Richmond Football Club players
Adelaide Football Club players
Indigenous Australian players of Australian rules football
Living people
Southern Districts Football Club players
Australian rules footballers from the Northern Territory
Sturt Football Club players
Northern Territory Football Club players
Coburg Football Club